Kay McFarland (July 20, 1935 – August 18, 2015) was a Chief Justice of the Kansas Supreme Court. She was the first female elected to a judgeship in Shawnee County, Kansas, first appointed to the state Supreme Court, and first to hold the title of chief justice.

Personal life
Kay McFarland was born on July 20, 1935, in Coffeyville, Kansas to Dr. Kenneth and Margaret McFarland. In 1957, she graduated magna cum laude from Washburn University in Topeka with dual majors in English and history-political science. She graduated from Washburn University School of Law in 1964. McFarland died on August 18, 2015.

Professional life
McFarland was admitted to the Kansas Bar and entered into private practice in 1964 in Topeka. In 1971, she was elected judge of the probate and juvenile courts of Shawnee County, becoming the first woman elected to a judgeship in that county.

In January 1973, she won election as judge of the newly created Fifth Division of the District Court in Topeka. On September 19, 1977, she was appointed to the Kansas Supreme Court by Governor Robert F. Bennett becoming the state's first female Supreme Court justice.

On September 1, 1995 she became Kansas's first female chief justice, replacing the retiring Hon. Richard Holmes. She resigned on January 12, 2009 due to state laws mandating retirement after the age of 70.

See also
List of female state supreme court justices

References

External links
Chief Justice Kay McFarland Named Distinguished Alumni
Official Biography

|-

1935 births
2015 deaths
Politicians from Topeka, Kansas
Kansas state court judges
Chief Justices of the Kansas Supreme Court
Washburn University alumni
Women chief justices of state supreme courts in the United States
Washburn University School of Law alumni
20th-century American judges
20th-century American women judges
21st-century American women